Levin may refer to:

 Levin (given name)
 Levin (surname)
 Levin, New Zealand, a town in southern North Island
 Toyota Corolla Levin, an automobile
 Levin (guitar company), Sweden
 Konstantin Dmitrievitch Levin, a character in Tolstoy's Anna Karenina
 Lewyn, a playable character in Fire Emblem: Genealogy of the Holy War, named Levin in Japan

See also 

 Leven (disambiguation)
 Levine
 Levinz, a surname
 Anatol Lieven
 Lieven
 Elia Levita